Udea planalis is a moth in the family Crambidae. It was described by South in 1901. It is found in western China.

References

planalis
Moths described in 1901